Margam and Tai-bach is the name of an electoral ward in Neath Port Talbot, Wales. It includes the communities of Margam, Margam Moors and Taibach. It elects three councillors to Neath Port Talbot County Borough Council. 

The ward was created following the recommendations of a local government boundary review, with the merger of the former Margam and Tai-bach wards.

According to the 2011 UK Census, the population of the Margam ward was 5,927 and in the Tai-bach ward it was 4,799.

2022 local election
Tai-bach has previously been represented by two Labour Party councillors, but neither stood for election in 2022. Rob Jones, Labour councillor for Margam stood again at this election, as did Dennis Keogh, former councillor for the nearby Port Talbot ward. Jones was also the former leader of the council.

All three seats were won by the Labour candidates.

See also
 List of electoral wards in Wales

References

Electoral wards of Neath Port Talbot